The 13th Jutra Awards were held on March 13, 2011 to honour films made with the participation of the Quebec film industry in 2010. Nominations were announced on February 9.

Winners and nominees

References

2011 in Quebec
Jutra
13
Jutra